Chris Abutu Garuba was Governor of Bauchi State, Nigeria from August 1985 to December 1988 during the military regime of Major General Ibrahim Babangida.
He was born in Ipole, Otukpa Ogbadibo Local Government Area of Benue State.

Military career

As Commander of 34 Self Propelled Artillery Brigade, Jos, Garuba lent his support to the coup of 27 August 1985 that brought General Ibrahim Babangida to power, leading the team that arrested the GOC of the 3rd Armoured Division, Brigadier Salihu Ibrahim.
Immediately after the coup, he was promoted to Colonel and was appointed Governor of Bauchi.

Garuba was an energetic administrator in Bauchi. He initiated the Rural Transformation Programme to develop roads, water, electricity, agriculture and education. He upgraded the Abubakar Tafawa Balewa Stadium and built the Multi-Purpose Indoor Sports Hall and various other sports venues. He established Bauchi State Polytechnic (now known as Abubakar Tatari Ali Polytechnic), the Inland Bank, Bauchi State Television Authority and Bauchi Printing and Publishing Company.

After returning to the army, Garuba held a series of local and foreign appointments, and rose to the rank of major general before retiring.
During the attempted coup of 22 April 1990 by Major Gideon Orkar, Brigadier Garuba was Corp Commander, Artillery. While the  centre of the military command in the Dodan Barracks was being retaken, he deployed additional units within and around Lagos on standby.
He was Chief Military Observer to the United Nations Angola Verification Mission II from July 1994 to February 1995, monitoring the cease fire between the rebel UNITA forces and the government troops.
He was appointed Commandant,  National War College, Abuja (colonels and brigadiers), and was a member of the Provisional Ruling Council in the Sani Abacha regime.
Garuba was chief of staff during the transitional regime of General Abdusalami Abubakar, who handed over power at the start of the Nigerian Fourth Republic.

Later career

In 2006, Garuba attempted to buy his official residence in Lagos when it was put up for sale, but the Presidential Implementation Committee under the Chairmanship of the Minister of State for Housing and Urban development, Grace Ekpiwhre, rejected his bid.
In July 2008 there were rumors that Garuba would be appointed Chief of Staff to President Umaru Yar'Adua after General Mohammed Abdullahi had resigned from that position.

Bibliography

References

Living people
1948 births
Nigerian Roman Catholics
Idoma people
Governors of Bauchi State
Founders of Nigerian schools and colleges
University and college founders